Elections to Oxford City Council were held on 7 May 1998.  One third of the council seats were up for election. The Labour party kept its overall majority on the council. The number of Councillors for each party after the election were Labour 33, Liberal Democrat 14 and Green 4.

Election result

|}

See also
Elections in the United Kingdom

References

1998
1998 English local elections
20th century in Oxford